Dick Smoker Plus is the debut split EP by Meathead and Cop Shoot Cop, released in September 24, 1996 by Fused Coil. The album comprises the first four tracks of Cop Shoot Cop and Meathead's Kill a Cop for Christ and Bring U His Head single and the last five tracks are from Meathead's Dick Smoker single. It also contains Cop Shoot Cop's final recording before disbanding, titled "¡Schweinhund!".

Reception

Aiding & Abetting called Dick Smoker Plus "a wildly diverse set of tunes (two EPs and two creative bands will do that to you) that could probably have used some cohesion, but will suffice in its current form. Some wonderful noises going on." Tom Schulte of AllMusic awarded the album three out of five stars and said "the "Dick Smoker" mixes are anthemic; potent and memorable" and that the bands "mix it up and mix each other in powerful, hard industrial forays." The critic went on to say "If Ministry and Godflesh bore you - and you do not want to be bored again - do your homework on both Cop Shoot Cop and Meathead." Sonic Boom gave the album a mixed review, saying "musically this EP is all over the place. It ranges from the very traditional guitar, drums, bass of CSC to club remixes almost totally devoid of a guitar" and "If you are either a CSC or Meathead completist you will want to pick up this EP which has tracks that appear nowhere else."

Track listing

Personnel
Adapted from the liner notes of Dick Smoker Plus.

Cop Shoot Cop
 Tod Ashley (Tod A.) – bass guitar
 Jim Coleman – sampler
 Jack Natz – bass guitar
 Phil Puleo – drums

Meathead
 Matteo Dainese – drums, percussion
 G.No – bass guitar
 Steve Nardini – sampler, backing vocals
 Mauro Teho Teardo – vocals, guitar, sampler, cover art, design

Production and design
 Zalman Fishman – executive-production

Release history

References

External links 
 Dick Smoker Plus at Discogs (list of releases)

1996 EPs
Split EPs
Cop Shoot Cop albums
Meathead (band) albums
Fifth Colvmn Records EPs